Hamad Fares Al Mansour (born August 19, 1993) is a Saudi professional footballer who plays a winger and full-back for Saudi Pro League side Al-Nassr.

Club career
Al Mansour started his journey working his way through the ranks of Najran. He made his professional debut for Najran on 3 January 2014. He was sent out on loan to Al-Hazem on 19 January 2016.

On 11 June 2017, Al Mansour left Najran and joined Pro League side Al-Faisaly. He helped the club reach the finals of the King Cup for the first time in their history.

On 11 March 2018, Al Mansour signed a pre-contract agreement with Al-Nassr. He officially joined the club at the conclusion of the 2017–18 season.

Style of play
Al Mansour usually plays as a left sided midfielder or a left back but he can also play as a centre and right midfielder. He has good control over the ball and plays with both feet. He usually takes long shots when he can and has good accuracy.

Career statistics

Honours
Al-Nassr
 Saudi Professional League: 2018–19
 Saudi Super Cup: 2019

References

External links
  Amazing Goal
 

1993 births
Living people
Saudi Arabian footballers
Najran SC players
Al-Hazem F.C. players
Al-Faisaly FC players
Al Nassr FC players
Ittihad FC players
Saudi First Division League players
Saudi Professional League players
People from Najran
Association football fullbacks
Association football wingers